is a fictional character from Gege Akutami's manga Jujutsu Kaisen 0. She is a young student from Jujutsu High, mentored by Satoru Gojo. While working on missions involving Curses, Maki mentors the newcomer Yuta Okkotsu who is trying to control the undead Rika which is attacking innocent people. The manga mentions Maki's origins as a reject from the Zen'in clan which is further explored in the sequel Jujutsu Kaisen where she is one year older and deals with several enemies.

Akutami created Maki as a character whose origins would be further explored in the series future with her fighting style being a mix of several ones envisioned in one. She is voiced by Mikako Komatsu in Japanese and Allegra Clark in English. Critical response to Maki's character has been positive in both Jujutsu Kaisen and the prequel for her striking personality and fighting skills, with the latter often noted to be strange to see in series aimed towards a male demography.

Creation
Though Maki was better known in Jujutsu Kaisen, manga author Gege Akutami recommended main series readers to check the prequel Jujutsu Kaisen 0 for a better understanding of her life. Her hair's length is something Akutami tends to change whenever he likes. Akutami also enjoys writing how Maki is shown to particularly strong physically in early in the series due to how she destroys a weapon using brute force. Akutami enjoyed writing a scene in which Yuta comforts Maki Zen'in in the third chapter, which causes Maki to leave and blush angrily about whether or not should feel accepted by him. Upon seeing this scene, Akutami's editor Katayama said Yuta really understood Maki's feelings. Akutami decided to revise this scene in the storyboard following his editor's praise.

Both the original mini-series and the main Jujutsu Kaisen manga early explore issues Maki has with other members from Zen'in clan to the point her weaponry is surprising but is related to the mentor Satoru Gojo. Akutami claimed in the thirteen volume that he planned to explore more focus more on the Zen'in clan problems. Her design went from normal glasses to black-frames in the sequel but only for the fight against Suguru Geto. When asked by why Maki often refers to Todo by his surname, Akutami mentioned it is a tendency of her to call others by their first name unless the others call her by her last name. As a result, he mentions any contradictions when dealing with others might come across as plot holes. Originally, Maki uses a weapon to compensate for her lack of spells. Akutami claimed in the series' fanbook that a major theme in the manga is Maki becoming a stronger Jujutsu sorcerer which is meant to be the focus on future installments. Maki's fighting style was based on both aikido and a mix of Chinese martial arts.

Casting

Mikako Komatsu voices Maki who noted the dynamic between her character, Panda and Toge Inumaki provided interesting comedy in both the television series and the movie prequel with Maki often being loud. Originally she was grown up and had an aggressive part, but was conscious that this work feels younger and more momentum in the reaction to what was said and what happened than in the TV series. Komatsu felt that the movie helped to explore her character's weakness, especially when she bonds with the shy Yuta Okkotsu as a result of their similarities as a result of his weak personality. Maki sees her strength in being able to express her feelings honestly in her weakness, and she feels frustrated in him, and she hits hard. Komatsu finds that Maki becomes more likable when interacting with Yuta despite her initial comments about how she perceives the young man. However, she considers this interaction to be to different from her role in the television series where her work with the protagonist Yuji Itadori who had little to no knowledge about spells. Komatsu also liked working in the movie for her action scenes and her meeting with Megumi Ogata, Yuta's actor, due to her performance.

Allegra Clark voices Maki in the English dub who sees her character's most notable traits are both "vulnerable" and "angry". However, Clark claims that thanks to the handling of these, Maki is enjoyable to play especially with her goals. She noticed about a major contrast between the television series and the movie in regards to how she tells Nobara and Yuta, respectively, what is her desire; In the television series she wants to become a stronger sorcerer while in the movie she instead more angry-driven towards her clan to the point of wanting to take them down. The rage that she felt in the film where she was younger, she is still finding acceptance, and but is not as mature as in the television series. Across the movie, she goes through a personal character arc where she grows more confidence. Satisfied with her role in the movie, Clark made research into the manga and wanted to keep playing Maki due to her further screentime that the anime has yet to explore.

Appearances

Jujutsu Kaisen 0
Maki Zen'in debuts in Jujutsu Kaisen 0 as a young student from Jujutsu High mentored by Satoru Gojo who brings a nervous teenager, Yuta Okkotsu, in order to train him and stop the curse of the undead girl Rika who is attacking everybody chasing Yuta. Early Maki mocks Yuta's weakness for being too passive, believing him to be the often subject of bullying. Although Yuta is unable to fight, he is assigned to work with Maki in exorcising a curse. When Maki is wounded, she asks Yuta what is his real desire to which he responds is that he only wants to enjoy a good life rather than remain alone. Maki encourages him to fight for such rights which allows her partner to control Rika for a brief period of time to escape with her.
In the next three months, Maki has become Yuta's mentor in swordplay so that he can also fight alone much to her comrade's surprise. When one of Satoru Gojo's friends, Suguru Geto, appears in Jujutsu High, it is revealed that Maki is a rejected member from the Zen'in clan and is mocked which angers Yuta. After the visit, Maki tells Yuta her hatred towards her clan to which Yuta agrees to fight alongside her, comforting her. Geto once again appears in Jujutsu High to take Rika's Curse, taking down all the students. Yuta takes control of Rika to save his mates, resulting in Geto escaping weakened.

Jujutsu Kaisen
In Jujutsu Kaisen, Maki appears one year older still as Sorcerer from Jujutsu High alongside Panda and Toge Inumaki as Yuta is working abroad. During an examination where the Kyoto students try to kill newcomer Yuji Itadori for possessing the vengeful spirit of Ryoma Sukuna, Maki joins Yuji's group and defeats her sister Mai who questions why she left their clan. During the Shibuya incident, Maki suffers several major wounds and loses an eye. After the incident, Maki still continues to fight alongside Yuta and the other Jujutsu High students against Geto's predecessor Kenjaku. After Mai sacrifices her life for Maki, she is able to see curses without glasses. After killing their father, she slaughters all members of the Zen'in clan in retribution for the pain she and Mai were forced to undergo during their childhood.

Reception
Critical response to Maki's character in the main series was positive during the Kyoto training arc between the Jujutsu students. When the character was about to show her skills for the first time, Anime News Network was tired of the several fights the arc had and hoped Maki would stand out in the narrative. The eventual battle between the Zen'in sisters earned praise for both the animation and exploration from Maki's past. The Fandom Post called Maki "the star of the show" due to how she overshadows her enemies and keeps a cocky personality, surpassing Nobara's character. Comic Book Resources claimed that Maki and Nobara "crush" society expectations also focusing on the handling of the sisters, leaving a bitterswit moment due to sadness the episode leaves as the family feuds from the Zen'in clan was not properly explained. Anime News Network enjoyed both the fighting coreography as it was more enjoyable than Yuji's battle among others. The site also found how "groundbreaking" the scene where Maki defeats Momo was. The eventual focus on Maki's actions in the series led Comic Book Resources to point out that the Zen'in clan did bad at disapproving Maki since she constantly surprises the audience and cast. Manga News felt the conflicts between the Zen'in sisters was well executed in the manga.

There was also commentary about Maki's role in Jujutsu Kaisen 0. According to Real, Maki is fundamental in starting Yuta's recovery from his trauma due to how she encourages him to earn the freedom he wants Mary Sue agreed with a similar praised for developing alongside Yuta; Real Sound particularly praised the bond the Jujutsu sorcerers have in general; in one volume, it is shown Maki trains Yuta and befriends in the process, which gives further depth to the main manga. Anime UK News felt that Maki's role in Jujutsu Kaisen 0 was better executed than in the main series based on her explored background. Digital Trends also felt that Maki's characterization was outstanding as she does not feel repetitive when dealing with Yuta as she feels different from the television series. Her action scenes were also noted be well executed by Hitc while calling her and the other students as comic relief in contrast to the more serious take on Yuta. The Mary Sue enjoyed Maki, calling her "an absolute QUEEN" and felt her backstory also standing out despite being similar to the main series. On the other hand, Otaquest lamented the demoted roles of the supporting characters in the finale when they are defeated by Geto. Similarly, Siliconera lamented that Maki's screentime in the film was limited as he liked the character and wished the franchise focused more on her.

In a Viz Media popularity poll conducted in March 2021, Maki was voted as the 11th most-popular character in the Jujutsu Kaisen franchise. Mikako Komatsu's performance as Maki was also praised by One Sports, considering her one of the best in the cast. Den of Geek regarded Maki as one of the best used female characters in shonen manga due to how she is portrayed as a skilled warrior rather than previous series where the female cast was used for a supportive role. The handling of her fights was also noted as she comes across as equally powerful as the protagonist Yuji Itadori despite having poor energy in comparison which heavily connects to her backstory which she takes seriously. Polygon agreed claiming that while there are series like Bleach, Soul Eater, Hunter x Hunter among feature similar female characters, their roles are limited or have unnispired powered when compared with the ones of the male characters. Comic Book Resources noted that Maki took a somber personality following the Shibuya arc while her body was so damaged in the process that it would surprise anime-only viewers.

References

Anime and manga characters who can move at superhuman speeds
Anime and manga characters with superhuman strength
Comics characters introduced in 2017
Fictional Japanese people in anime and manga
Fictional characters missing an eye
Fictional characters with disfigurements
Fictional demon hunters
Fictional exorcists
Fictional female martial artists
Fictional ghost hunters
Fictional kenjutsuka
Fictional patricides
Fictional polearm and spearfighters
Fictional stick-fighters
Fictional swordfighters in anime and manga
Fictional twins
Female characters in anime and manga
Female soldier and warrior characters in anime and manga
Martial artist characters in anime and manga
Teenage characters in anime and manga